The 2014 Vuelta a Castilla y León was the 29th edition of the Vuelta a Castilla y León cycle race and was held on 16 May to 18 May 2014. The race started in Ciudad Rodrigo and finished in Bembibre. The race was won by David Belda.

General classification

References

Vuelta a Castilla y León
Vuelta a Castilla y León by year
2014 in Spanish sport